Sainte-Hénédine is a parish municipality in La Nouvelle-Beauce Regional County Municipality in the Chaudière-Appalaches region of Quebec, Canada. Its population is 1,440 as of the Canada 2021 Census.

It is named after Catherine-Hénédine Dionne, widow of Pierre-Elzéar Taschereau, who owned the two seigneuries from which the territory of Sainte-Hénédine was detached.

History

The parish was first settled in 1852 and became a parish town in 1855.

Demographics 

Economy

Most of the residents in Sainte-Hénédine are farmers and mostly focused on dairy farming. A few homes line the main street of the town.

Government

Sainte-Hénédine forms part of the federal electoral district of Beauce and has been represented by Richard Lehoux of the Conservative Party since 2019. Provincially, Sainte-Hénédine is part of the Beauce-Nord electoral district and is represented by Luc Provençal of the Coalition Avenir Québec since 2018.

The parish town council consists of 5 councilors and a mayor. As of 2013 the current town council consists of:

Michel Duval - Maire
Réjean Deblois - Conseiller
Clermont Maranda - Conseiller
Pierre Nadeau - Conseiller
Mélissa Leblond - Conseillère
Jean-François Nadeau - Conseiller
Marilyn Roy - Conseillère

The mayor is also a member of the regional county council for la Nouvelle-Beauce.

Services provided by the parish includes:

 Recycling and Waste
 Fire Services - single fire station

Buildings

The smallest buildings in the parish are residential homes and are two stories tall. Large structures are usually barns and silos on dairy farms. The largest and tallest building in town is the Sainte-Hénédine Church (Église Sainte-Hénédine). This is second church built (first in the 1800s), it was blessed in 1912 and consecrated in 1992.

Transportation

Roads
There are a few key roads within the parish:

 rue Principale (Route Sainte-Therese or Rue Desjardin)
 Highway 275 - rue Langevin

The parish is short distance from Quebec Autoroute 73, which travels north toe Quebec City.

Air
There are no airports in parish, the closest are Québec City Jean Lesage International Airport and Québec/Lac Saint-Augustin Water Airport.

Education

The parish has a single elementary school,  École la Découverte, with the Commission scolaire de la Beauce-Echemin. For secondary education students are sent to Polyvalente Benoît-Vachon in Sainte-Marie.

Bibliothèque de Quebec has branch in Sainte-Hénédine, Bibliothèque La Détente, providing public library access to parish residents.

References

External links

Parish municipalities in Quebec
Incorporated places in Chaudière-Appalaches